Lomonosov's invariant subspace theorem is a mathematical theorem from functional analysis about the existence of invariant subspaces of a linear operator on some complex Banach space. The theorem was proven in 1973 by the Russian-American mathematician Victor Lomonosov.

Lomonosov's invariant subspace theorem

Notation and terminology

Let  be the space of bounded linear operators from some space  to itself. For an operator  we call a closed subspace  an invariant subspace if , i.e.  for every .

Theorem

Let  be an infinite dimensional complex Banach space,  be compact and such that . Then there exist an invariant subspace  of the operator , i.e. .

Citations

References

  

 
 
Functional analysis
Operator theory
Theorems in functional analysis